Timothy or Tim Johnson may refer to:

Arts and media
Tim Johnson (artist), contemporary Australian artist who collaborated with Kumantje Jagamara in the 1980s
Tim Johnson (film director) (born 1961), American film director
Timothy Johnson (medical journalist) (born 1936), American television personality and author
Tim Johnson (songwriter) (1960–2012), songwriter and producer

Sports
Tim Johnson (baseball) (born 1949), American shortstop and manager
Tim Johnson (curler) (born 1953), American curler
Tim Johnson (cyclist) (born 1977), American professional cyclocross racer
Tim Johnson (defensive lineman) (born 1965), American football defensive lineman
Tim Johnson (American football coach) (born 1962), American college coach of Kansas City's Avila University Eagles
Tim Johnson (linebacker) (born 1978), American football linebacker 
Tim Johnson (wheelchair rugby) (born 1976), New Zealand wheelchair rugby player
Timothy Johnson (fighter) (born 1985), American mixed martial artist

Others
Tim Johnson (Illinois politician) (1946–2022), U.S. Representative from Illinois, 2001–2013
Tim Johnson (South Dakota politician) (born 1946), U.S. Senator from South Dakota, 1997–2015
Timothy C. Johnson, American economist
Timothy H. Johnson, American politician, member of the Kansas House of Representatives
Timothy L. Johnson (born 1959), American politician, member of the Mississippi State Senate 
Timothy Johnson, pioneer and founder of Watertown, Wisconsin
Timothy Johnson, fatally shot Arkansas State Democratic Party Chairman Bill Gwatney, August 13, 2008
Tim Johnson, a character in Harper Lee's To Kill a Mockingbird

See also
Tim Johnston (disambiguation)